William McAndrew (3 September 1887 – 23 December 1965) was a Scottish professional footballer and manager. He played for Queen's Park, Clyde, Third Lanark and Dundee Hibernian.

Career 
During his Clyde career, he played for the club in the 1912 Scottish Cup Final and represented the Scottish League three times. After a spell as caretaker player-manager while with Dundee Hibernian, McAndrew got his first permanent appointment as a manager with Hamilton Academical in 1925. He remained in the role for 21 years, taking the club to the 1935 Scottish Cup Final as well as a fourth place League finish in the same season. He briefly managed Dunfermline Athletic in 1947.

Personal life 
McAndrew served in the First World War as a lieutenant in the Glasgow Highlanders and was held as a prisoner of war.

References

1887 births
1965 deaths
Scottish footballers
Scottish football managers
Queen's Park F.C. players
Clyde F.C. players
Third Lanark A.C. players
Dundee United F.C. players
Scottish Football League players
Scottish Football League representative players
Dundee United F.C. managers
Hamilton Academical F.C. managers
Dunfermline Athletic F.C. managers
British Army personnel of World War I
World War I prisoners of war held by Germany
British World War I prisoners of war
Association football wing halves
Scottish military personnel
Glasgow Highlanders officers